Lisa Wojno (born May 31, 1972) is a former Democratic member of the Michigan House of Representatives.

Early life 
Wojno was born on May 31, 1972 in Warren, Macomb County, Michigan.

Personal life 
Lisa Wojno married Paul Wojno. She has three children. Wojno is Catholic.

Political career 
Succeeding her husband, Paul Wojno, Lisa Wojno served as a member of the Michigan House of Representatives from 2003 to 2008.

References 

Living people
1972 births
Women state legislators in Michigan
People from Warren, Michigan
Catholics from Michigan
Spouses of Michigan politicians
Oakland University alumni
Democratic Party members of the Michigan House of Representatives
21st-century American politicians
21st-century American women politicians